Sergio Alejandro "Matute" García Nario (born September 19, 1982) is a Mexican former footballer who played as a goalkeeper for Veracruz on loan from Tigres UANL in the Liga Bancomer MX.

Career

Querétaro
García made his professional first division debut on 17 March 2012 against Guadalajara, the club that owned his contract at the time.

References

External links

1982 births
Living people
Footballers from Guadalajara, Jalisco
Association football goalkeepers
Mexican footballers
C.D. Guadalajara footballers
Chivas USA players
C.D. Veracruz footballers
Leones Negros UdeG footballers
Querétaro F.C. footballers
Tigres UANL footballers
Chiapas F.C. footballers
FC Juárez footballers
Major League Soccer players
Liga MX players
Mexican expatriate footballers
Expatriate soccer players in the United States